The 2021 Faroe Islands Premier League was the 79th season of top-tier football in the Faroe Islands, and the 17th under the current format.

HB were the defending champions, having won their 24th Faroese title in the previous season.

Teams
Skála (relegated after five years in the top flight) and Argja Bóltfelag (relegated after three years in the top flight) were relegated after last season. They were replaced with 07 Vestur (promoted after a two-year absence) and B68 Toftir (promoted after a four-year absence).

League table

Fixtures and results
Each team plays three times (either twice at home and once away or once at home and twice away) against each other team for a total of 27 matches each.

Rounds 1–18

Rounds 19–27

Top goalscorers

References

External links
  
 Faroe Islands Premier League on soccerway

Faroe Islands Premier League seasons
1
Faroe
Faroe